This article displays the rosters for the teams competing at the 2019 Women's EuroHockey Nations Championship. Each team had to submit 18 players.

Pool A

Belgium
The squad was announced on 6 August 2019.

Head coach: Niels Thiessen

Netherlands
The squad was announced on 1 August 2019.

Head coach:  Alyson Annan

Russia
The squad was announced on 14 August 2019.

Head coach: Svetlana Ivanova

Spain
The squad was announced on 13 August 2019.

Head coach:  Adrian Lock

Pool B

Belarus
Head coach:  Herman Kruis

England
The squad was announced on 7 August 2019.

Head coach:  Mark Hager

Germany
The squad was announced on 25 July 2019.

Head coach:  Xavier Reckinger

Ireland
Head coach:  Sean Dancer

References

Squads
Women's EuroHockey Nations Championship squads